The Etosha Pan is a large endorheic salt pan, forming part of the Cuvelai-Etosha Basin in the north of Namibia. It is a hollow in the ground in which water may collect or in which a deposit of salt remains after water has evaporated. The 120-kilometre-long (75-mile-long) dry lakebed and its surroundings are protected as Etosha National Park, Namibia's second-largest wildlife park, covering . The pan is mostly dry but after a heavy rain it will acquire a thin layer of water, which is heavily salted by the mineral deposits on the surface.

Location and description

Etosha, meaning 'Great White Place' in Oshindonga, is made of a large mineral pan. 

The pan is believed to have developed through tectonic plate activity over about ten million years. Around 16,000 years ago, when ice sheets were melting across the land masses of the Northern Hemisphere, a wet climate phase in southern Africa filled Etosha Lake. Today however the Etosha Pan is mostly dry clay mud split into hexagonal shapes as it dries and cracks, and is seldom seen with even a thin sheet of water covering it.

It is assumed that the Kunene River fed the lake at that time, but tectonic plate movements over time caused a change in river direction, resulting in the lake running dry and leaving a salt pan. Now the Ekuma River, the Nipelo River, the Cuvelai River and the Omurambo Ovambo River are the sole seasonal source of water for the lake. Typically, little river water or sediment reaches the dry lake because water seeps into the riverbed along its  course, reducing discharge along the way.

History
In the colonial era, the first non-Africans to explore this area were the Europeans Charles John Andersson and Francis Galton in 1851.

Plants and animals

The surrounding area is dense mopane woodland which is occupied by herds of elephants on the south side of the lake. Mopane trees are common throughout south-central Africa, and host the mopane worm, which is the larval form of the moth Gonimbrasia belina, and an important source of protein for rural communities.

The salt desert supports very little plant life except for the blue-green algae that gives the Etosha its characteristic colouring, and grasses like Sporobolus spicatus which quickly grow in the wet mud following a rain. Away from the lake there is grassland that supports grazing animals.

This harsh dry land with little vegetation and small amounts of salty water, when it is present at all, supports little wildlife all year round but is used by a large number of migratory birds. The hypersaline pan supports brine shrimp and a number of extremophile micro-organisms tolerant of the high saline conditions.(C.Michael Hogan. 2010.) In particularly rainy years the Etosha pan becomes a lake approximately 10 cm in depth and becomes a breeding ground for flamingos, which arrive in their thousands, and great white pelican (Pelecanus onocrotalus).

The surrounding savanna is home to thousands of mammals that will visit the pan and surrounding waterholes when there is water. These include quite large numbers of zebra, wildebeest, gemsbok, springbok and eland, as well as black rhinoceros, bush elephants, lions, leopards, and giraffe.

Threats and protection
The Etosha Pan is completely within the national park and is designated as a Ramsar wetland of international importance and a World Wildlife Fund ecoregion (Etosha Pan halophytics).

References

C.Michael Hogan. 2010. Extremophile. eds. E.Monosson and C.Cleveland. Encyclopedia of Earth. National Council for Science and the Environment, Washington DC

Etosha National Park

Salt pans of Namibia
Etosha National Park
Ecoregions of Namibia
Zambezian region